The black-crowned waxbill (Estrilda nonnula) is a common species of estrildid finch found in western-central Africa. It has an estimated global extent of occurrence of 1,000,000 km2.

Subspecies 
 E. n. elizae Alexander, 1903 : Bioko I.		
 E. n. eisentrauti	Wolters, 1964 : Mt. Cameroon		
 E. n. nonnula Hartlaub, 1883 : se Nigeria and Cameroon to se Sudan, w Kenya and nw Tanzania

Origin
Origin and phylogeny has been obtained by Antonio Arnaiz-Villena et al.. Estrildinae may have originated in India and dispersed thereafter (towards Africa and Pacific Ocean habitats).

References

External links
BirdLife International species factsheet

black-crowned waxbill
Birds of the Gulf of Guinea
Birds of Central Africa
black-crowned waxbill